{{DISPLAYTITLE:C15H10O6}}
The molecular formula C15H10O6 (molar mass : 286.23 g/mol, exact mass : 286.047738) may refer to:

 Asphodelin A, a coumarin
 Aureusidin, an aurone
 Citreorosein, a polyketide
 Fisetin, a flavonol
 Kaempferol, a flavonol
 Isoscutellarein, a tetrahydroxyflavone
 Lunatin, an anthraquinone
 Luteolin, a tetrahydroxyflavone
 Norartocarpetin, a tetrahydroxyflavone
 Orobol, an isoflavone
 Scutellarein, a tetrahydroxyflavone
 Thunberginol B, an isocoumarin